Maranovići  is one of the oldest villages on Mljet in Croatia. The place is located on eastern part of the D120 highway that runs through the whole island. Olive production is the main occupation.

Maranovici also has its parish church of Sveti Anton.

References

Populated places in Dubrovnik-Neretva County
Mljet